Golovkovskaya is a rural locality (a village) in Argunovskoye Rural Settlement of Velsky District, Arkhangelsk Oblast, Russia. The population was 71 as of 2014. There is 1 street.

Geography 
Golovkovskaya is located on the Vaga River, 8 km east of Velsk (the district's administrative centre) by road. Plesovskaya is the nearest rural locality.

References 

Rural localities in Velsky District